

Adams County

Alamosa County

Arapahoe County

Archuleta County

Baca County

Bent County

Boulder County

City and County of Broomfield

Chaffee County

Cheyenne County

Clear Creek County

Conejos County

Costilla County

Crowley County

Custer County

Delta County

City and County of Denver

Dolores County

Douglas County

Eagle County

El Paso County

Elbert County

Fremont County

Garfield County

Gilpin County

Grand County

Gunnison County

Hinsdale County

Huerfano County

Jackson County

Jefferson County

Kiowa County

Kit Carson County

References